George Edward Anderson (29 November 1879 – 1962), sometimes known as Teddy Anderson, was an English professional football outside left who played in the Football League for Birmingham. He also played in the Southern League for Brentford.

Personal life 
Anderson later worked as an engineer for a Glaholm and Robson Ltd, a Sunderland-based company which made colliery equipment. He retired in 1953, after 39 years with the company. His wife, Mary (née Fullerd), died in 1950.

Career statistics

References

1879 births
1962 deaths
Footballers from Sunderland
English footballers
Association football outside forwards
Sunderland Albion F.C. players
Birmingham City F.C. players
Brentford F.C. players
Sunderland Rovers F.C. players
English Football League players
Southern Football League players
Date of death missing
English engineers